Anders Olofsson (31 March 1952 – 22 January 2008) was a Swedish racing driver.

Racing career
He won back-to-back Swedish Formula Three titles in 1977 and 1978 and finished runner-up in the FIA European Formula 3 Championship in the same seasons.

He won three consecutive Japanese Touring Car titles as a works Nissan driver and triumphed in the 1991 Spa 24 Hours, driving a Nissan Skyline with David Brabham and Naoki Hattori.

From 1988 to 1995, Olofsson competed six times in the Bathurst 1000 touring car race in Australia, all with Gibson Motorsport. He drove in the 1988 Tooheys 1000 with Glenn Seton in a Nissan Skyline HR31 GTS-R, though the pair failed to complete a lap after the gearbox broke when Seton changed from second to third gear only seconds after the rolling start (the same fate had befallen Seton and Olofsson on lap 3 of the Sandown 500 just three weeks earlier, the traditional lead in to Bathurst). In 1989 he returned, driving with George Fury in a HR31 Skyline to finish fourth. After a two-year absence he returned for Winfield Racing (Gibson) in 1992 (the final year of Group A) in a Nissan Skyline R32 GT-R to finish third outright with television commentator turned racer Neil Crompton. Despite Australian touring car racing abandoning Group A at the end of 1992 and moving to a V8 formula, Olofsson was held in such regard by the Fred Gibson run team that he was invited to return in 1993 and finished fourth with David Brabham in a Holden VP Commodore and 1994 to drive with veteran Colin Bond (the 1969 race winner) to finish sixth in a VP Commodore. Olofsson's last Bathurst 1000 was again with the Gibson team in 1995 where he teamed with Steven Richards in a Holden VR Commodore to again finish fourth.

Olofsson finished second overall and won the GT1 class of the 1997 Le Mans 24 Hours, sharing a Gulf McLaren F1 with Jean-Marc Gounon and Pier-Henri Raphanel.

He retired from racing at the end of 1997 and worked in driver management with Swedish racers in the Swedish Touring Car Championship.

Death
Olofsson died in his sleep on 22 January 2008, aged 55.

Career Results

Complete Spa 24 Hour results

Complete 24 Hours of Le Mans results

Complete Bathurst 1000 results

References

1952 births
2008 deaths
Swedish racing drivers
European Formula Two Championship drivers
FIA European Formula 3 Championship drivers
24 Hours of Le Mans drivers
World Sportscar Championship drivers
24 Hours of Spa drivers
Japanese Touring Car Championship drivers

Nismo drivers
Japanese Sportscar Championship drivers
Team LeMans drivers